Bishop Dwenger High School is a co-educational college preparatory high school in the Roman Catholic Diocese of Fort Wayne–South Bend in Fort Wayne, Indiana, United States. Dwenger is named after Joseph Gregory Dwenger, the second Bishop of the Roman Catholic Diocese of Fort Wayne–South Bend.

Academic awards
Catholic High School Honor Roll - America's Top 50 (2006)
National Blue Ribbon School (2004)
Indiana 5 Star School (2018)

Athletics
The Bishop Dwenger athletic program has won state championships in the following sports:

Cheerleading (1998, 2000, 2007, 2008, 2010, 2011, 2016, 2019)
Gymnastics (1995, 2003, 2005, 2006, 2012)
Football (1983, 1990, 1991, 2015, 2018)
Girls' soccer (2005, 2006, 2020)
Softball (2010)
Rugby (2004, 2015)
Ice hockey (2014, 2019)
Volleyball (2020)

Clubs and activities
Bishop Dwenger has 45 clubs and service organizations. 80% of all students have been involved in at least three extracurricular activities, as reported by the school. Bishop Dwenger offers the following clubs and activities:

Key Club (Service Work Club), Future Business Leaders of America, National Honors Society, Student Council, Newspaper, Spanish Club, French Club, Academic Super Bowl, Science Olympiad, Yearbook, Marching Band, Show Choir, Choir, Art, Tutoring, Gym Help, Technology Club, Scrabble Club, Table Tennis Club, Chess Club, Speech Team, Spell Bowl, Winter Guard, Performing Arts, Social Justice Club, SADD (Students Against Destructive Decisions), Project Linus, Mother Teresa Club, Spirit Club, Dance Team, Rosary Club, Decade Club, Saints for Life, Latin Club.

Notable alumni
 Tom Dixon (born 1961), former professional football player
 Tyler Eifert (born 1990), Free agent professional football player
 Jason Fabini (born 1974), former NFL offensive lineman
 Eddie Gallagher (born 1979), former US Navy SEAL pardoned by President Trump from war crimes charges
 Sarah Killion Woldmoe (born 1992), professional soccer player; plays for Chicago Red Stars of the National Women's Soccer League (NWSL)
 Andrea Russett (born 1995), Internet personality
 Kimberly Brubaker Bradley (born 1967) author
 Michael Y. Scudder (born 1971) United States Circuit Judge, appointed by President Trump in 2018

See also
 List of high schools in Indiana
 Summit Athletic Conference

References

External links
 

Educational institutions established in 1963
Catholic secondary schools in Indiana
Private high schools in Indiana
Roman Catholic Diocese of Fort Wayne–South Bend
Schools in Fort Wayne, Indiana
1963 establishments in Indiana